Said Ahmed Shah (28 April 1940 – 5 February 2021) was a Pakistani academic and cricket umpire. He stood in one Test match, Pakistan vs. West Indies, in 1984 and five ODI games between 1984 and 1997. He also stood in ninety-four first-class cricket and forty-seven List A cricket matches between 1972 and 2000.

He was educated at the Islamia College Peshawar between 1957 and 1963 where he did his masters in political science and history. He started his career as a lecturer in Charsaddah College before being transferred to Government College, Peshawar in 1980 where he retired as a professor of history twenty years later.

See also
 List of Test cricket umpires
 List of One Day International cricket umpires

References

1940 births
2021 deaths
People from Peshawar
Pakistani Test cricket umpires
Pakistani One Day International cricket umpires
Islamia College University alumni